First Avenue station is a station on Pittsburgh Regional Transit's light rail network. The station is part of the light rail's Downtown Pittsburgh free zone, and passengers embarking here may travel for free to any of the other stations within the zone (Steel Plaza, Wood Street, Gateway, North Side and  Allegheny).

The station was a new addition to the light rail system in 2001, located in the PNC Firstside Complex, just before the tracks dip into the subway tunnel. It was opened on November 16, 2001 to provide better access to the southern quarter of downtown, which includes city and state government offices, major office buildings such as Oxford Centre and the Grant Building, downtown educational facilities such as Point Park University, Duquesne University and the Art Institute of Pittsburgh, and the many smaller office structures that mark this area of the Golden Triangle.  It cost $6.7 million to construct.

Bus connections
67 Monroeville 
69 Trafford
65 Squirrel Hill

See also
Grant Street Station (former train station near site of First Avenue station)

References

External links 

Port Authority T Stations Listings

Port Authority of Allegheny County stations
Railway stations in the United States opened in 2001
Railway stations in Pennsylvania at university and college campuses
2001 establishments in Pennsylvania
Blue Line (Pittsburgh)
Red Line (Pittsburgh)
Silver Line (Pittsburgh)